Adetus nesiotes is a species of beetle in the family Cerambycidae. It was described by Linsley and Chemsak in 1966.

References

Adetus
Beetles described in 1966